Hal Scardino (born Albert Henry Hugh Scardino; December 25, 1984) is an American-British producer and former child actor. best known for having played the leading role in the movie The Indian in the Cupboard. He also starred in Searching for Bobby Fischer, Marvin's Room, and The Show (2015).

Scardino appeared in the play Saltonstall's Trial by Michael Cormier in October 2019 in Beverly, MA.

Biography
Born in the United States of America in Savannah, Georgia, Scardino grew up in the London neighborhood of Knightsbridge. He is the youngest of three children born to Marjorie Morris Scardino, chief executive officer of media group Pearson, and Albert Scardino, a Pulitzer Prize-winning journalist. His current living relatives include Juliet Eliana Scardino and Brian Paul Scardino 

He was educated at Winchester College, an independent school for boys in England. He graduated in 2008 from Columbia University, where he competed on the Columbia Lions fencing team.

Filmography
Searching for Bobby Fischer (1993) as Morgan
The Indian in the Cupboard (1995) as Omri
Marvin's Room (1996) as Charlie
The Show (2015) as Ethan (also producer)

References

External links

Hal Scardino TVGuide listing

Living people
1984 births
American male child actors
American male television actors
American male film actors
Columbia Lions fencers